Emelie Catharina Leontine Törling (née: Norenberg, born 21 February 1985) is a Swedish singer and designer. She is most famous for her music.

Early life
Emelie Norenberg was born on 21 February 1985, and grew up north of Stockholm. She has one sister, Amanda, and one brother, Oscar. As a child she was most interested in music and gymnastics, and learnt piano by ear at the age of five, as well as being trained in classical music for years. She also competed in the Gymnastic Nationals. Eventually, she was accepted into a music school, Rytmus. Her classmates included former Play members, Rosanna Munter and Fanny Hamlin.  Emelie says she loves to travel, and has lived and studied abroad in many places, such as Abu Dhabi, London and Sydney, as well as working as an air hostess in many middle eastern countries.

Career Beginnings
As for a music career, Emelie has been a demo artist, freelance singer, and most notably sung as choir for the popular Swedish artist, E-Type, on tour along with future Play member Sanne Karlsson. Emelie has also released a single, "Strong" by Stellar Project in the U.S

Personal life
She has had her own jewelry brand named Leontine since August 2012 and a band named America, together with her fiancé Gustaf Törling. In June 2013 they married, and in December 2014 their daughter Nico Annais Rio Belle Törling was born, 10 weeks prematurely. In July 2018 they welcomed their second daughter, Gia Aymeline Ava Héloïse Törling, in Stockholm.

Time in Play
Play was originally formed in 2001 in Sweden by current manager, Laila Bagge. It was made of four young girls: Faye Hamlin, Anaïs Lameche, Rosanna and Anna Sundstrand. They had limited success, their greatest hit being their debut, "Us Against The World" peaking at No. 14. Fanny left the group in 2004 to pursue a college education, and a new member, Janet Leon was added to the group, until the group split in 2005. A reunion was made in 2009 with original members Anais & Fanny, along with a new member, Sanne Karlsson via the popular Swedish TV program "Made in Sweden". They released their comeback single, "Famous" on 15 February 2010 and it reached No. 1, getting Play back into the spotlight. Play spent the rest of the year promoting and touring Sweden to promote their new album "Under My Skin". The plan for 2011 was to make an impact on the U.S. music markets as they once did many years ago.

Emelie, prior to joining Play was friends with current members Sanne & Anaïs and former member Rosanna. Towards the end of 2010, Faye, who Emelie also knew, was no longer mentioned in Play's blog, and she no longer appeared in any pictures or public appearances. There were also multiple sources stating that Fanny was working on a solo career. On 7 February 2011, the band officially announced that Faye had left Play for good and would be replaced by Emelie.

Play were planning their comeback to the U.S. markets, and going on frequent trips to America to attend meetings. An EP was planned to be released in August 2011, but in May 2011 the group split.

Solo career
She is currently one of two members in a band named "America", with her husband Gustaf Törling. The music is dreamy desert rock. On 19 July 2011 Stellar Project released digitally their new single "Strong" featuring the vocals of Emelie Norenberg.

References
 https://web.archive.org/web/20101225013627/http://annakopito.freshnet.se/tag/emelie/
http://valentine-nyc.com/Gustaf-Emelie-No.37

External links
 
 https://archive.today/20130411063704/http://www.leontinejewelry.com/love/ Emelies official blog
 https://web.archive.org/web/20130328000759/http://leontinejewelry.com/ Emelies official jewelrypage

Swedish artists
1985 births
Living people
 Singers from Stockholm